Maidsville is an unincorporated community in Monongalia County, West Virginia, United States.

According to tradition, Maidsville was so named on account of there being a large share "old maids" among the first settlers.

Maidsville has a post office with ZIP code 26541. Near Maidsville is the Longview Power Plant, the cleanest, most efficient coal-fired power plant in the 13 state PJM Interconnection and one of the cleanest and most efficient in the United States.

References

Unincorporated communities in Monongalia County, West Virginia
Unincorporated communities in West Virginia
Coal towns in West Virginia